Artoriellula is a genus of spiders in the family Lycosidae that was first described in 1960 by Roewer.

, it contains 2 species occurring in South Africa and Sulawesi.

References

Lycosidae
Araneomorphae genera
Spiders of Africa
Spiders of Asia
Taxa named by Carl Friedrich Roewer